A total solar eclipse will occur over much of the central Eastern Hemisphere on Monday, August 2, 2027. It will commence over the eastern Atlantic Ocean and travel past the Strait of Gibraltar between Spain and Morocco. Totality will be visible in southern Spain as well as parts of North Africa and the Middle East, as well as the northern tip of the Horn of Africa. A partial eclipse visible in much of the Eastern Hemisphere. Major cities under the path will include Luxor in central Egypt, Jeddah and Mecca in southern Saudi Arabia, and Sana'a in southern Yemen. It will be the first of three total solar eclipses that are observable in Tunisia in the 21st century, passing over the central part of the country.

Images 
Animated path

Related eclipses

Eclipses in 2027
 An annular solar eclipse on February 6.
 A penumbral lunar eclipse on February 20.
 A penumbral lunar eclipse on July 18.
 A total solar eclipse on August 2.
 A penumbral lunar eclipse on August 17.

Solar eclipses 2026–2029

Saros 136

Metonic series

References

External links 
 NASA eclipse plot

2027 in science
2027 8 2
2027 8 2
Solar Eclipse Articles